Platerówka  is a village in Lubań County, Lower Silesian Voivodeship, in south-western Poland. It is the seat of the administrative district (gmina) called Gmina Platerówka.

The village has a population of 580.

The name Platerówka comes from  the name of the Polish Independent Women's Battalion, Emilia Plater (of the Polish I Corps in the Soviet Union), whose soldiers inhabited the village.

References

Villages in Lubań County